Venezia Mestre railway station is a junction station in the comune of Venice, Italy. It is located within the mainland frazione of Mestre, and is classified by its owner, Rete Ferroviaria Italiana, as a gold category station.

The station is situated at the  mark of the Milan–Venice line, and at the  mark of the Adria–Mestre line. It is also the point of origin of other lines that converge towards Venice as the capital of the region Veneto.

Additionally, the station forms the border between the boroughs of Mestre and Marghera, that are connected by the two underpasses of the station, one just for pedestrians and the other for both pedestrians and cyclists.

Venezia Mestre is one of Venice's two most important railway stations, the other one being Venezia Santa Lucia, a terminal station on the island of Venice. Both stations are managed by Grandi Stazioni, and they are linked with each other by the Ponte della Libertà between the mainland and the island.

While Venezia Santa Lucia station's main doors are usually closed at night, Venezia Mestre station is always open and people can pass by also at night, to get on one of the few night trains or to use the underpasses between Mestre and Marghera (shops and ticket offices are usually closed at night).

Late night or early morning trains might stop at Venezia Mestre station if the Venezia Santa Lucia station is closed at such time.
In that case, passengers directed to/coming from the Historical Center of Venice they should use the 24/7 ACTV bus service (lines 2 and H1) from Piazzale Roma to Venezia Mestre station and vice versa.

Train services
The following services call at the station:

High speed services (Frecciarossa) Salerno – Naples – Rome – Florence – Bologna – Padua – Venice
High speed services (Italo) Salerno – Naples – Rome – Florence – Bologna – Padua – Venice
High speed services (Frecciarossa) Naples – Rome – Florence – Bologna – Padua – Venice
High speed services (Frecciarossa) Rome Airport – Rome – Florence – Bologna – Padua – Venice
High speed services (Frecciarossa) Turin – Milan – Verona – Padua – Venice – Trieste
High speed services (Frecciarossa) Turin – Milan – Verona – Padua – Venice
High speed services (Frecciarossa) Milan – Verona – Padua – Venice – Treviso – Udine
High speed services (Frecciargento) Reggio Calabria – Lamezia Terme – Paola – Salerno – Naples – Rome – Florence – Bologna – Ferrara – Padua – Venice
High speed services (Frecciabianca) Lecce – Bari – Ancona – Rimini – Padua – Venice
Intercity services (EuroCity) Munich – Innsbruck – Verona – Padua – Venice
Intercity services (EuroCity) Zurich – Arth-Goldau – Bellinzona – Milan – Verona – Padua – Venice
Intercity services (EuroCity) Geneva – Lausanne – Brig – Milan – Verona – Padua – Venice
High speed services (Railjet) Vienna – Klagenfurt – Villach – Udine – Treviso – Venice
Intercity services (Intercity) Rome – Florence – Bologna – Padua – Venice – Trieste
Night train (Nightjet) Munich – Tarvisio – Udine – Treviso – Venice
Night train (Nightjet) Rome – Bologna – Venice – Villach – Vienna
Night train (Nightjet) Vienna – Linz – Salzburg – Villach – Udine – Treviso – Venice
Night train (Intercity Notte) Rome – Bologna – Venice – Udine – Trieste
Express services (Regionale Veloce) Bologna – Ferrara – Rovigo – Padua – Venice
Express services (Regionale Veloce) Verona – Vicenza – Padua – Venice
Express services (Regionale Veloce) Verona – Padua – Venice – Latisana
Express services (Regionale Veloce) Trieste – Cervignano del Friuli – Portogruaro – Venice
Express services (Regionale Veloce) Trieste – Gorizia – Udine – Treviso – Venice
Regional services (Treno regionale) Ferrara – Rovigo – Monselice – Padua – Venice
Regional services (Treno regionale) Verona – Vicenza – Padua – Venice
Regional services (Treno regionale) Trieste – Gorizia – Udine – Treviso – Venice
Regional services (Treno regionale) Bassano del Grappa – Castelfranco Veneto – Venice
Local services (Treno regionale) Portogruaro – Venice
Local services (Treno regionale) Adria – Piove di Sacco – Venice

Traffic
Venezia Mestre is a crucial part of the railway system of the north east of Italy. An important port for both freight and passengers, it has approximately 500 trains and 85,000 passengers each day.  It is also a strategic hub, at which the Milan–Venice, Venice–Udine, Trento–Venice, Venice–Trieste and Adria–Mestre lines converge, and from which a four track main line leads to Venezia Santa Lucia.

Future developments
Venezia Mestre will be one of the railway stations on the so-called Pan-European Corridor 5. It will also be part of the Veneto region's Metropolitan Regional Rail System (SFMR) network, which will involve all of its lines. For better management of the Venezia Mestre railway junction, numerous works are therefore currently underway.

First, the number of platforms at the station is being increased from nine to thirteen, together with crossing loops.

Secondly, and most importantly, work is being done to achieve the partial reactivation of Linea dei Bivi, which has been closed since 1993. The reactivated line will begin at Marocco junction, on the Venice-Udine line, and end almost at the former Mirano junction. It will include the former Orgnano double junction, and Spinea junction, on the Trento–Venice line.

Instead of merging with the Milan-Venice line in the direction of Lombardy's capital, the reborn Bivi line passes over a curved bridge, the Maerne viaduct, which crosses more than four tracks of the Milan line. The reopened Bivi line then joins the Milan-Venice line at the Venice Mestre station throat. This arrangement separates the Trento and Milan lines from each other, and also create an alternative route for trains to Udine.

The new line from the former Orgnano double junction over the Maerne viaduct to Venezia Mestre was officially opened on 30 May 2008 and entered service on 10 June 2008. From 7 June 2008, there was consequential abandonment of the Gruppo Scambi (ex Quadrivio Catene) high speed line between the former Orgnano double junction and just before Venezia Mestre, including the former Venezia Asseggiano railway station. The closed portion of line will be reused as a disused railway bicycle path.

These changes will assign to each incoming line a dedicated track, without any intersections between the lines. In particular, tracks 1 and 2 are assigned to the line from Trieste, tracks 3 and 4 to the Udine line, 5 and 6 to the Padua high speed line, 9, 10 and 11 to the original Padua line, and 12 and 13 to the lines for Adria and Trento. Finally, tracks 7 and 8 will be dedicated to those trains leaving or arriving at Venezia Mestre that do not also leave or arrive from Venezia Santa Lucia.

The Venezia Mestre station building is also being modified with a view to better organization of spaces, and to suit commercial services closely linked to the railway, such as the ticket office. It will also become fully accessible to disabled people, through the construction of lifts to each platform.

In the first half of 2009, all the old paddle type destination boards at the station were replaced with new boards fitted with LED displays.

Public transport connections
The station is served by several ATVO suburban bus routes, and 15 urban and 1 suburban bus routes operated by ACTV, 13 of them in transit.

Urban/suburban buses
 2 VENEZIA – DELLA LIBERTÀ – VEMPA – MESTRE FS – PIAVE – CIRCONVALLAZIONE – TORRE BELFREDO – V.LE GARIBALDI – S.DONÀ – PASQUALIGO – V.LE DON STURZO
 3 SFMR OSPEDALE – DON PERON – TERRAGLIO – TREZZO – V.LE GARIBALDI – TORRE BELFREDO – CIRCONVALLAZIONE – CARDUCCI –  CAPPUCCINA – VEMPA – DURANDO – P.ZZALE GIOVANNACCI – LAVELLI – P.ZZA S.ANTONIO – PALEOCAPA – TRIESTE – CATENE – VILLABONA
 10 ASSEGGIANO – IST.MORIN – GAZZERA ALTA – QUARNARO – MATTUGLIE – CALABRIA – MIRANESE – CARDUCCI – CAPPUCCINA – MESTRE FS – TRENTO – MIRANESE – CALABRIA – MATTUGLIE – CALUCCI – GAZZERA ALTA – ASSEGGIANO
 15  AEROPORTO M.POLO – TESSERA – ORLANDA – FORTE MARGHERA – P.ZZA 27 OTTOBRE – CORSO DEL POPOLO – VEMPA – MESTRE FS
 18 MESTRE FS – VEMPA – F.LLI BANDIERA – MALCONTENTA – DELLA STAZIONE – PADANA – COLOMBARA – CA' SABBIONI
 31  PERTINI (IST.FOSCARI) – BISSUOLA – COLOMBO – OLIVI – CARDUCCI – PIAVE – MESTRE FS
 31H OSPEDALE – DON TOSATTO – DON PERON – TERRAGLIO – CIRCONVALLAZIONE – PIAVE – MESTRE FS – CA' MARCELLO – TORINO (UNIVERSITÀ) – V.LE ANCONA – FORTE MARGHERA – MESTRE CENTRO – V.LE S.MARCO – VIA SANSOVINO – V.LE VESPUCCI – RIONE PERTINI – PERTINI – BISSUOLA – MESTRE CENTRO – S.ROCCO – EINAUDI – TORRE BELFREDO – CIPRESSINA – OSPEDALE
 32 MESTRE FS – PIAVE – CIRCONVALLAZIONE – EINAUDI – GIULIANI – TORRE BELFREDO – V.LE GARIBALDI – SPALTI – BISSUOLA – PERTINI – CAMPORESE (IST.GRITTI)
 32H OSPEDALE – CIPRESSINA – EINAUDI – S.ROCCO – MESTRE CENTRO – BISSUOLA – PERTINI – RIONE PERTINI – V.LE VESPUCCI – VIA SANSOVINO – V.LE S.MARCO – MESTRE CENTRO – 27 OTTOBRE – FORTE MARGHERA – V.LE ANCONA – VIA TORINO – CA' MARCELLO – MESTRE FS – PIAVE – CIRCONVALLAZIONE – TERRAGLIO – DON PERON – DONTOSATTO – OSPEDALE
 33H  OSPEDALE – CASTELLANA – VIA PIAVE – MESTRE FS – CORSO DEL POPOLO – VIA BISSUOLA – CAVERGNAGO
 34H OSPEDALE – TERRAGLIO -VIA PIAVE – MESTRE FS – CORSO DEL POPOLO – BISSUOLA – PERTINI
 43 VENEZIA – DELLA LIBERTÀ – SAN GIULIANO – FORTE MARGHERA – V.LE ANCONA – TORINO (UNIVERSITÀ) – CÀ MARCELLO – MESTRE FS
 53  PIAZZA 27 OTTOBRE – VIA PIAVE – MESTRE FS – MONTEFIBRE – MALCONTENTA
 86  MESTRE FS – VEMPA – BANCHINA DELL'AZOTO
 N1  VENEZIA – V.LE S. MARCO – PIAZZA 27 OTTOBRE – VIA PIAVE – MESTRE FS – VENEZIA
 8AE VIA MATTEI / MARCON – MOGLIANO – MESTRE CENTRO

See also

History of rail transport in Italy
List of railway stations in Veneto
Marghera
Rail transport in Italy
Railway stations in Italy
Venezia Santa Lucia railway station

References

External links

Description and pictures of Venezia Mestre railway station 

This article is based upon a translation of the Italian language version as at August 2010.

Buildings and structures in Venice
Railway stations in Veneto
Transport in Venice
1842 establishments in the Austrian Empire
Railway stations in Italy opened in 1842